Eva Lucy Harwood (1 January 1893 – 24 October 1972) was a British artist known for her landscape paintings of East Anglia and Suffolk.

Biography
Harwood was born at Belstead near Ipswich and moved with her family to East Bergholt while still a young child. A botched medical operation left Harwood partially paralysed on her right-hand side and ended her ambition to be a professional pianist. Turning to art, rather than music, Harwood enrolled in the Slade School of Fine Art in London prior to the start of World War I. In 1937 she studied at the East Anglican School of Printing and Drawing in Dedham run by Cedric Morris. Harwood remained with the School when it re-located to Benton End at Hadleigh in 1940 and was associated with the School in various roles for many years.

Working with her left hand only, Harwood created still-life and landscape paintings of Suffolk, in particular of the area around her home at Upper Layham but also of other parts of Britain and abroad. Harwood generally painted with a vivid, colour palette and described herself as a Post-Impressionist. A retrospective exhibition of her work was held at The Minories art centre in Colchester in 1975 and further shows followed at Sally Hunter Fine Art. Both the Ipswich Museum and the Colchester Art Society hold examples of her work.

References

External links

1893 births
1972 deaths
20th-century English painters
20th-century English women artists
Alumni of the Slade School of Fine Art
Artists from Ipswich
English women painters
People from East Bergholt